Feather cloaks have been used by several cultures.

Hawaii
Elaborate feather cloaks called ʻahuʻula were created by early Hawaiians  for the alii (royalty).  
Feathers were also used in women's skirts called pāū. 
The iiwi (Vestiaria coccinea) and apapane (Himatione sanguinea), which provided red feathers, were killed and skinned due to their abundance. Yellow feathers were obtained from the mostly black and rarer ōō (Moho nobilis) and mamo (Drepanis pacifica) using a catch and release philosophy to ensure future availability.

Famous works include:
 Nāhienaena's Paū, feather skirt of Princess Nāhienaena and funeral garment of Hawaiian royals 
 Kamehameha's Cloak, feather cloak of Kamehameha I made entirely of the golden-yellow feather of the mamo, used by the kings of Hawaii
 Kiwalao's Cloak, feather cloak of Kīwalaʻō captured by Kamehameha I in 1782, used by the Queens of Hawaii
 Liloa's Kāei, sash of King Liloa of the island of Hawaii

Brazil
Feather cloaks were known to the coastal Tupi people, notably the Tupinambá. The cloaks called gûaraabuku were dressed by the paîé (Tupian shamans) during rituals. They were made from the red plumage of gûará (Eudocimus ruber) and had a hood at the top, which could cover the entire head, shoulders and thighs up to the buttocks.

Māori
In Māori culture feathers are a sign of chiefly rank, and the kahu huruhuru (feather cloak), is still used as sign of rank or respect.

Germanic
Bird- or feather cloaks that enable the wearers to take the form of, or become, birds are widespread in Germanic mythology and legend. The term  can be translated as various terms such as skin, cloak, costume, coat or form.

Gods and jötnar 

In Norse mythology, goddesses Freyja and Frigg each own a feather cloak or feather costume that imparts the ability of flight. Freyja is not attested as using the cloak herself, however she lent her  ("feather cloak"), to Loki so he could fly to Jötunheimr after Þórr's hammer went missing in Þrymskviða, and to rescue Iðunn from the jötunn Þjazi in Skáldskaparmál who had abducted the goddess while in an  "eagle shape".

In Ynglinga Saga, Óðinn is described as being able to change his shape into that of animals. In the story of the Mead of Poetry from Skáldskaparmál, he does not explicitly require a physical item to assume an "eagle-form" to flee with the mead, in contrast to the jötunn Suttung, who must put on his in order to pursue him.

Heroic legend 

In Völsunga saga, the wife of King Rerir is unable to conceive a child and so the couple prays to Odin and Frigg for help.

The master smith Wayland forges a pair of wings to help his escape from King Niðhad after he is hamstrung, as depicted on a panel of the 8th-century whale-bone Franks Casket and described in the corresponding episode preserved in the Þiðreks saga. Though the flying apparatus is called "wings" or "a wing", borrowed from the German , the finished product is said to be very much like a  flayed from a griffin, or vulture, or an ostrich.

Translations 
There are also several attested uses of the term  found in foreign material translated into Old Norse. One example is Breta sögur, an Old Norse adaptation of Geoffrey of Monmouth's History of the Kings of the Britons that describes a pseudo-history of the Celtic Britons. In the original source, Bladud's flying contraption is described as a set of artificial wings he orders to be made.

Other 
There are bird-people depicted on the Oseberg tapestry fragments, which may be some personage or deity wearing winged cloaks, but it is difficult to identify the figures or even ascertain gender.

Celtic

In Ireland, the elite class of poets known as the filid wore a feathered cloak, the tuigen (see Suibhne Gelt).

In the Germanic Speculum regale - Konungs skuggsjá we can read a description of these poets in the chapter dealing with Irish marvels (XI)  : 

"There is still another matter, that about the men who are called “gelts,” which must seem wonderful. Men appear to become gelts in this way: when hostile forces meet and are drawn up in two lines and both set up a terrifying battle-cry, it happens that timid and youthful men who have never been in the host before are sometimes seized with such fear and terror that they lose their wits and run away from the rest into the forest, where they seek food like beasts and shun the meeting of men like wild animals. It is also told that if these people live in the woods for twenty winters in this way, feathers will grow upon their bodies as on birds; these serve to protect them from frost and cold, but they have no large feathers to use in flight as birds have. But so great is their fleetness said to be that it is not possible for other men or even for greyhounds to come near them; for those men can dash up into a tree almost as swiftly as apes or squirrels."

The tuigen is also described in Cormacs Glossary and in the Colloquy of the two Sages.

This concept is adapted to the Greek mythology ; Mercury, god of medicine, wears a "bird covering" or "feather mantle" rather than talaria (usually conceived of as feathered slippers) in medieval Irish versions of the Greco-Roman classics, such as the Aeneid.

Explanatory notes

References

Bibliography

Primary

  and "", p. xxii, 'valshamr'.
 
 
   The chapter numbering follows the 1848 Copenhagen edition, which is the one usually cited (p. xxiii).

Secondary
 
 
 
 
 
 
 
 
 . Originally

Further reading
The Saga of Thidrek of Bern. Translated by Edward R. Haymes. New York: Garland, 1988. .

Polynesian clothing
Textile arts of Hawaii
History of Oceanian clothing
Featherwork